Ylppö may refer to:

 Arvo Ylppö, Finnish pediatrician
 2846 Ylppö, asteroid